José Mora (born 8 August 1975) is an Ecuadorian international footballer who played as a striker.

Career
He played club football for Barcelona de Guayaquil.

He made his international debut for Ecuador in 1995.

References

1975 births
Living people
Ecuadorian footballers
Ecuador international footballers
Barcelona S.C. footballers
Association football forwards